Leucopogon acuminatus is a species of flowering plant in the heath family Ericaceae and is endemic to the Northern Territory. It is a compact, erect shrub with narrowly elliptic or lance-shaped leaves and small groups of white or cream-coloured flowers.

Description

Taxonomy and naming
Leucopogon acuminatus was first formally described in 1810 by Robert Brown in his Prodromus Florae Novae Hollandiae. The specific epithet (acuminatus) means "pointed".

Distribution and habitat
This leucopogon mainly grows in heath and woodland in the Top End of the Northern Territory from Bathurst and Melville Islands to the Gulf of Carpentaria and as far south as Katherine.

References

acuminatus
Ericales of Australia
Flora of the Northern Territory
Plants described in 1810
Taxa named by Robert Brown (botanist, born 1773)